Stan or Stanley Davis may refer to:

Stan Davis (The Southern Vampire Mysteries)
Stan Davis, inventor of the typeface Amelia
Stan Davis (American football), played in 1973 Philadelphia Eagles season
Stanley Stewart Davis (born 1942), professor of pharmacy
Stanley Clinton Davis (born 1928), British politician

See also
Stanley Davies (disambiguation)